The 2009 UAE International Cup was held in Al Ain City with the participation of four teams. They were UAE, Czech Republic, Iraq and Azerbaijan. The first games were on 15 November 2009. On that day, Iraq played Azerbaijan, and that game was followed by the match between UAE and Czech Republic. The final was played on 18 November 2009 between Iraq and UAE. The third-placed match was also played on that day featuring Azerbaijan and Czech Republic. Iraq were the only team not to concede a goal in the tournament.

Knockout stage

Semi-finals

Third place match

Final

Awards

Scorers
1 goals

 Mahdi Karim
 Ruslan Abishov
 Vagif Javadov
 Bassim Abbas

External links
UAE International Cup 2009 on GOALZZ.com

2009
Inter
2009–10 in Iraqi football
2009–10 in Czech football
2009–10 in Azerbaijani football